Patrick O'Neill (b Fedamore 8 February 1891; d Limerick 26 March 1958) was an Irish Roman Catholic Bishop.

Early life and education

Patrick O'Neill was born at Grange, Fedamore, Co Limerick to John and Mary O’Neill and was educated at St Munchin's College before proceeding to St. Patrick’s College, Maynooth for his studies for the priesthood. He was ordained priest in June 1915 and remained in Maynooth to prepare for a Doctorate in Divinity.

References

1891 births
Bishops of Limerick
People educated at St Munchin's College
1958 deaths
20th-century Roman Catholic bishops in Ireland
Alumni of St Patrick's College, Maynooth
Academics of St Patrick's College, Maynooth